Liner or LINER may refer to:

Line drawing 
 Eye liner, a type of makeup
 Marker pen, a porous-tip pen with its own ink source
 Multiple lining tool used in engraving
 A sable brush used by coach painters

Linings 
 Acoustic liner, a noise-damping panel in an aircraft engine
 Album liner, a record sleeve or combination of sleeve and outer sheath (usually printed cardboard) in which a vinyl record is stored
 Liner notes, text printed on or accompanying the sheaths, cases and other forms of packaging in which vinyl records, CDs, DVDs, etc., are stored
 Bin liner, a protective layer fitted inside a bin
 Landfill liner, a membrane placed at the bottom of landfills 
 Liner, an installation of well-drilling casing that does not extend to the surface
 Liner (sewing)
 Release liner, a paper or film used on labels and adhesive tapes to cover the adhesive until ready for use

Transportation 
 Airliner, a large fixed-wing aircraft for transporting passengers and cargo
 Ocean liner, a type of passenger ship used primarily for long-distance transportation
 Cruise ship, also known as a cruise liner, a passenger ship used primarily for recreation
 Ship of the line, a type of warship used from the 17th century to the 19th century

Other uses 
 Liner (baseball) or "line drive", a type of baseball stroke
 Linerboard or "liner", a type of paperboard used in making corrugated fiberboard
 Low-ionization nuclear emission-line region (LINER), a class of galactic nuclei (also used to refer to galaxies with such nuclei)
 Liner (band), a reincarnation of the British rock band Blackfoot Sue
 R-29RMU2 Layner (Liner), Russian submarine-launched missile